Platynota obliqua is a species of moth of the family Tortricidae. It is found in Mexico (Tabasco) and Costa Rica.

The wingspan is about 16 mm. The forewings are pale stone grey, with a short oblique costal streak near the base and a very oblique fascia. The hindwings are pale cupreous.

References

Moths described in 1913
Platynota (moth)